Tigrioides grisescens is a moth in the family Erebidae. It was described by George Thomas Bethune-Baker in 1908. It is found in New Guinea, where it is found in Papua New Guinea and the Central Mountain Range in Papua.

References

Moths described in 1908
Lithosiina